Wes Clark may refer to:

 Wes Clark (basketball), American basketball player
 Wesley Clark, American army general, retired
 Wesley A. Clark, computer scientist